This is a list of diplomatic missions in Togo.  At present, there are 16 embassies/high commissions resident in Lomé, with several other countries accrediting ambassadors from neighboring countries.

Diplomatic missions in Lomé

Embassies/High Commissions 
Entries marked with an asterisk (*) are member-states of the Commonwealth of Nations. As such, their embassies are formally termed as "high commissions".

*

*

*

*

Other missions or delegations 
 (Consulate-General)
 (Delegation)

Non-resident embassies

 (Paris)
 (Accra)
 (Paris)
 (Paris)
 (Accra)
 (Abuja)
 (Accra)
 (Paris)
 (London)
 (Abuja)
 (Paris)
 (Abuja) 
 (Cotonou)
 (Cotonou)
 (Paris)
 (Paris)
 (Abuja)
 (Abuja)
 (Paris)
 (Abuja)
 (Abuja)
 (Abuja)
 (Accra)
 (Dakar)
 (Paris)
 (Cotonou)
 (Accra)
 (Accra)
 (Addis Ababa)
 (Paris)
 (Paris)
 (Abuja)
 (Abuja)
 (Accra)
 (Conakry)
 (Abuja)
 (Paris)
 (Accra)
 (Abuja)
 (Abuja) 
 (Abidjan)
 (Accra)
 (Accra)
 (Abidjan)
 (Abuja) 
 (Abuja)
 (Cotonou)
 (Brussels)
 (Paris)
 (Abuja) 
 (London)
 (Accra)
 (Accra)
 (Accra)
 (Abuja)
 (Accra)
 (Abuja)
 (Cairo)
 (Abuja)
 (Tripoli)  
 (Abuja)
 (Abuja)
 (Abuja)
 (Abuja)
 (Paris) 
 (Abuja)
 (Cotonou)
 (Accra) 
 (Accra)
 (Accra)
 (New York City)
 (Accra)
 (Abuja)
 (Abidjan)
 (Accra)
 (Abuja)
 (Accra)
 (Accra)
 (Abuja)
 (Abuja)
 (Paris)
 (Abidjan)
 (Accra)
 (Accra)
 (Paris)
 (Abuja)
 (Paris)
 (Accra)
 (Abuja)

See also
 Foreign relations of Togo

References

External links
 Togolese Ministry of Foreign Affairs (in French)
 Togo diplomatic list

Diplomatic missions
Togo
Diplomatic missions